The Aiguille de Borderan (2,492 m) is a mountain in the Aravis Massif in Savoie and Haute-Savoie, France.

References

Mountains of the Alps
Mountains of Savoie
Mountains of Haute-Savoie